Per Andersson i Koldemo  (14 February 1876 – 4 February 1944) was a Swedish politician. He was a member of the Farmer's League (Centre Party), representing Gävleborg County in the upper house of the Swedish bicameral parliament from 1922 until his death in 1944.

References

Members of the Riksdag from the Centre Party (Sweden)
1876 births
1944 deaths
Members of the Första kammaren